Shamas-un-Nisa Memon is a Pakistani politician who has been a member of the National Assembly of Pakistan, since August 2018. Previously she was a member of the National Assembly from August 2013 to May 2018.

Political career

Shamas-un-Nisa was elected as the member of the National Assembly of Pakistan as a candidate of Pakistan Peoples Party (PPP) from Constituency NA-237 (Thatta-I) in by-election held in August 2013. She received 84,819 votes and defeated Syed Riaz Hussain Shah Sherazi, a candidate of Pakistan Muslim League (N) (PML-N). The seat became vacant after Sadiq Ali Memon who won it in May 2013 election was disqualified to continue in office because of dual nationality case.

She was re-elected to the National Assembly as a candidate of PPP from Constituency NA-232 (Thatta) in 2018 Pakistani general election.

References

Living people
Pakistan People's Party politicians
Sindhi people
Pakistani MNAs 2013–2018
People from Sindh
Women members of the National Assembly of Pakistan
Year of birth missing (living people)
Pakistani MNAs 2018–2023
21st-century Pakistani women politicians